Mahanay Island is a small island in Central Visayas in the Philippines. It is slightly north of Bohol island, with Banacon island and its surrounding reef to the north, Handayan Island to the west, and Tambu, Banbanon, and Bansaan Islands to the east.

Population
As of 2015, the island has a population of 2,344, of which 1,806 (or 77%) live in the Talibon Municipality, with the remaining 538 (or 23%) living in the Getafe Municipality, which makes up the western third of the island. This is a slight increase from the island's 2010 population of 2,143. The island's primary access is via a short boat trip from Getafe or Talibon.

Islands of Bohol